Suricata is an open-source based intrusion detection system (IDS) and intrusion prevention system (IPS). It was developed by the Open Information Security Foundation (OISF). A beta version was released in December 2009, with the first standard release following in July 2010.

Free intrusion detection systems

 OSSEC HIDS
 Prelude Hybrid IDS
 Sagan
 Snort
 Zeek NIDS

See also

 Aanval

References

External links
 
 Open Information Security Foundation
 

Computer security software
Free security software
Free network-related software
Intrusion detection systems
Linux security software
Unix security-related software